Gilbert Roland Hill (November 5, 1931 – February 29, 2016) was an American politician, police officer, and actor, who was the President of the Detroit City Council. He gained recognition for his role as Inspector Todd in the Beverly Hills Cop film series. He was the runner-up in the 2001 Detroit mayoral election, losing to Kwame Kilpatrick.

Biography

Early life
Born in Birmingham, Alabama, Hill was the son of Mary Lee Hill, who raised him and his sister Toni, alone.  In the 1940s, Hill moved with his mother and sister to Washington, D.C.  Hill attended Cardozo High School, graduating in 1949.  Hill had wished to attend Howard University, but was not able due to strained financial resources.

Instead, Hill joined the United States Air Force in 1950 and was stationed at Selfridge Air Force Base near Detroit. After leaving the Air Force in 1953, he returned to the Detroit area, where he worked a number of jobs for the next four years.

Law enforcement career
Hill joined the Wayne County Sheriff's Department in 1957, but quickly became disillusioned with the slow pace, so he joined the Detroit Police Department in 1959. In 1969 he was promoted to detective and was assigned to the homicide division the following year. Over the next decade, Hill rose to national attention for his ability to obtain confessions out of the most notorious killers.  He was involved in the investigation surrounding the Atlanta Child Murders in 1979 that ultimately resulted in the trial and conviction of Wayne Williams.

Hill was promoted to the rank of Inspector in charge of the Homicide Division by 1982, and in 1989, retired from the Detroit Police Department at the rank of Commander.

In 2016, former hit man Nate "Boone" Craft alleged that Hill had once offered to pay him $125,000 to kill Richard Wershe Jr., to keep Wershe from revealing alleged corruption in the Detroit police department.

Political career
Following his retirement from police work he became a councilman for Detroit, becoming its president in 1997, and running unsuccessfully for mayor against Kwame Kilpatrick in 2001. He was initially considered to be the leading candidate, and had support from many people connected with incumbent mayor Dennis Archer..  In 2019, a portrait of Hill was unveiled at the Coleman A. Young Municipal Center in downtown Detroit, a tradition carried out for all former City Council Presidents.

Acting career
Already a prominent figure in law enforcement, Hill appeared in the Beverly Hills Cop films, playing the role of Inspector Todd, the boss of Eddie Murphy's character, Axel Foley. Offered other acting work after the film's release, Hill declined to pursue acting as a career, but did appear in the two subsequent sequels of the movie, saying that the only difference between his famous character's life and his own was that he did not curse as much in real life.

Personal life and death
Hill married Dolores Hooks, who sang in a local church choir, in 1955.  They remained married until her death in 2015.  They had two sons and a daughter.

Hill died from pneumonia at the age of 84 on February 29, 2016, at DMC Sinai-Grace Hospital in Detroit, Michigan.

Filmography 

Gill Hill also appeared as himself in the documentary, White Boy Rick, in which the details of his corruption during his time as a Detroit Law Enforcement Officer, were revealed.

References

Sources
People Jan. 7, 1985

External links
 Metro Times overview of Hill's 2001 election campaign
 

1931 births
2016 deaths
African-American city council members in Michigan
African-American male actors
African-American police officers
American actor-politicians
American male film actors
American police detectives
Beverly Hills Cop (franchise)
Deaths from pneumonia in Michigan
Detroit City Council members
Detroit Police Department officers
Male actors from Birmingham, Alabama
Michigan Democrats
Politicians from Birmingham, Alabama
20th-century American male actors
20th-century American politicians
21st-century American politicians
20th-century African-American politicians
21st-century African-American politicians